The 2003 Monte Carlo Masters was a men's tennis tournament played on outdoor clay courts. It was the 97th edition of the Monte Carlo Masters and was part of the Tennis Masters Series of the 2003 ATP Tour. It took place at the Monte Carlo Country Club in Roquebrune-Cap-Martin in France from 14 April through 20 April 2003.

The men's field was headlined by Juan Carlos Ferrero, Carlos Moyá and Andy Roddick. Other top seeds in the field were Albert Costa, Jiří Novák, David Nalbandian, Paradorn Srichaphan and Rainer Schüttler.

Rafael Nadal, then aged 16, made his tournament debut in this year, losing to Guillermo Coria in the Round of 16. This would be the last time in which he would be defeated at the event until 2013.

Finals

Singles

 Juan Carlos Ferrero defeated  Guillermo Coria 6–2, 6–2
 It was Ferrero's 1st title of the year and the 8th of his career. It was his 1st Masters title of the year and his 8th overall. It was also his 2nd consecutive win at the event.

Doubles

 Mahesh Bhupathi /  Max Mirnyi defeated  Michaël Llodra /  Fabrice Santoro 6–4, 3–6, 7–6 (8–6)
 It was Bhupathi's 2nd title of the year and the 28th of his career. It was Mirnyi's 4th title of the year and the 17th of his career.

References

External links
 
 ATP tournament profile
 ITF tournament edition details

 
Monte Carlo Masters
Monte Carlo Masters
Monte-Carlo Masters
Monte
Monte Carlo Masters